Dofus – Book 1: Julith is a 2015 French animated fantasy film directed by Anthony Roux and Jean Jacques Denis, from a screenplay by Roux and Olivier Vannelle. Based on the 2004 video game Dofus and its sequel Wakfu, the film is set in the Krosmoz fictional universe. Dofus – Book 1: Julith was produced by Ankama Animation, and co-produced by France 3 Cinema and Pictanovo. It had its world premiere at the Arras Film Festival on 7 November 2015, before being released in French cinemas on 3 February 2016 where it received a polarised critical reception.

Premise 
Joris Jurgen lives with his adoptive father Kerubim Crépin, an old anthropomorphic cat, in the peaceful city of Bonta. One day, the despicable Julith, whom posses great magical powers, tries to steal the Ebony Dofus—a dragon egg that contains unimaginable power. With the newly befriended Khan and Bakara, Joris must try to save the city from the clutches of Julith.

Voice cast 
Laëtitia Lefebvre as Julith
Elisabeth Ventura as Bakara
Sauvane Delanoe as Joris
Claire Baradat as Lilotte
Jean-Claude Donda as Kerubim Crepin
Francois Siener as Luis
Mathias Kozlowski as Guy
Emmanuel Gradi as Khan Karkass
Bernard Alane as Atcham
Patrick Poivey as Dardondakal
Marc Saez  as Marline
Laurence Breheret as Grimalkin Twins
Philippe Catoire as King of Bonta
Xavier Fagnon as Leon Zitroll

Production 
The budget for the film was €7.5 million. The soundtrack was composed by Guillaume Houzé, with songs performed by the National Orchestra of Lille and Star Pop Orchestra. The soundtrack was released as a compact disc (CD) on 16 January 2016.

Release 
Dofus – Book 1: Julith had its world premiere at the Arras Film Festival on 7 November 2015, before being released theatrically in French on 3 February 2016. The film was a box office bomb, grossing $624,747 at the French box office.

References

External links 
 (in French)

2015 films
2015 computer-animated films
2010s French animated films
French fantasy adventure films
France 3 Cinéma films